Joseph Oma Adah (born 8 June 1999) is a Nigerian footballer who plays as a winger for Belarusian Premier League club Dinamo Minsk.

Career
On 25 January 2020, FC Pyunik announced the signing of Adah. He went on to make six appearances and scored one goal for Pyunik before his contract expired and he left the club.

On 25 February 2021, Adah signed for Shakhter Karagandy.

Career statistics

Club

References

External links

1999 births
Living people
People from Abuja
Nigerian footballers
Association football wingers
Katsina United F.C. players
FC Slutsk players
FC Pyunik players
FC Gandzasar Kapan players
FC Shakhter Karagandy players
FC Olimp-Dolgoprudny players
FC Dinamo Minsk players
Belarusian Premier League players
Armenian Premier League players
Russian First League players
Nigerian expatriate footballers
Nigerian expatriate sportspeople in Belarus
Expatriate footballers in Belarus
Nigerian expatriate sportspeople in Armenia
Expatriate footballers in Armenia
Nigerian expatriate sportspeople in Kazakhstan
Expatriate footballers in Kazakhstan
Nigerian expatriate sportspeople in Russia
Expatriate footballers in Russia